Benglenisky at , is the 368th–highest peak in Ireland on the Arderin scale.  Benglenisky is the second most southern peak, after neighbouring Benlettery, of the Twelve Bens mountain range in the Connemara National Park in Galway, Ireland, and is the lowest of the core Twelve Bens.

Naming
According to Irish academic Paul Tempan, meaning "the glen of water", is from the glen on the south-east side of this peak. The green Connemara marble is quarried in Barr na nÓrán, which was first started by Thomas Barnwall Martin in the 1820s.

Geography

Benglenisky is the second southernmost peak of the Twelve Bens after Benlettery ,  and lies at the western edge of the range. 

Benglenisky is connected to the range by a high north-easterly ridge to the peak of Bengower ; this ridge forms a fork which also connects neighboring Benlettery to Bengower.  Benglenisky sits off the main ridge of the six Bens that form a horseshoe around the valley of the Glencoaghan River (also known as the Glencoaghan Horseshoe), and is thus less frequented.

Benglenisky is the lowest of the core Twelve Bens, and only meets the mountain classification of an Arderin.  Its relative positioning at the southern end of the range, jutting out on its own ridge, means that it often appears as a scenic backdrop to Ballynahinch Castle and the Ballynahinch Lake, however, it is still overshadowed by its more dramatic neighbour, Benlettery, with its striking "pyramidal" profile.

Hill walking

As with Benlettery, Benglenisky's accessibility means that it can be summited as a standalone 5-kilometre 2-3 hour climb (starting and ending at the Ben Lettery An Oige youth hostel); however, the high ridge Benglenisky shares with the peaks of Bengower and Benlettery, means that it is also climbed as part a 7-kilometre 3-4 hour horseshoe loop-walk with these peaks.

Benglenisky does not feature on the core route of the more famous 16–kilometre 8–9 hour Glencoaghan Horseshoe, considered one of Ireland's best hill-walks; or the even longer Owenglin Horseshoe, a 20–kilometre 10–12 hour route around the Owenglin River taking in over twelve summits.

Gallery

Bibliography

See also

Twelve Bens
Mweelrea, major range in Killary Harbour
Maumturks, major range in Connemara
Lists of mountains in Ireland

References

External links
MountainViews: The Irish Mountain Website, Benglenisky
MountainViews: Irish Online Mountain Database
The Database of British and Irish Hills , the largest database of British Isles mountains ("DoBIH")
Hill Bagging UK & Ireland, the searchable interface for the DoBIH

Mountains and hills of County Galway
Geography of County Galway
Mountains under 1000 metres